The 1955 Pan American Games opened on March 12, 1955, in the University Stadium (now Olympic Stadium) in Mexico City, Mexico, in front of a capacity crowd of 100,000 spectators.

A total number of 2,583 athletes from 22 nations marched in review and formed ranks upon the infield. The nations paraded into the stadium in Spanish alphabetical order:  Argentina, Bahamas, Brazil, Canada, Colombia, Costa Rica, Cuba, Chile, El Salvador, United States, Guatemala, Haiti, Jamaica, Netherlands Antilles, Panama, Paraguay, Puerto Rico, Dominican Republic, Trinidad and Tobago, Uruguay, Venezuela, and Mexico. The hot sun, combined with the high altitude, caused two members of the U.S. team to collapse. Both quickly recovered.

Host city selection 
On March 6, 1951, PASO selected Mexico City over Guatemala City to host the II Pan American Games. Seventeen of the eighteen countries participated in the vote, with El Salvador abstaining. Guatemala City received two votes, one from Guatemala and one from Mexico, and Mexico City received the remaining fifteen votes.

Medal table

Sports

 
 
 
 
 Cycling
  Road (2)
  Track (3)
 
 
 
 
 Gymnastics
  Artistic (12)

References

External links
 Mexico City 1955 - II Pan American Games - Official Report at PanamSports.org